Aaron Katersky is an American ABC News Radio correspondent based in New York City. He covered the Iraq War, the death of Pope John Paul II, and the Arab Spring.

Katersky also reports on military affairs from posts around the country, on Wall Street from the New York Stock Exchange, on terrorism from the federal courts and on world affairs from the United Nations. He is ABC News Radio's special events anchor, leading live coverage of Michael Jackson's death, the 2008 presidential election and the royal wedding of Prince William and Kate Middleton in London.

Prior to working at ABC News, Katersky worked at radio stations in Houston, Syracuse, New York, Hartford, Connecticut and Southeastern Massachusetts.

Katersky is a graduate of Syracuse University with dual degrees in broadcast journalism and religion.  Originally from Scituate, Massachusetts, he now lives in New York City with his wife, Marcy.

References

External links 
 ABC Radio Website
 ABC News Website

1975 births
Living people
ABC News personalities
Syracuse University alumni